25 Years – The Chain is a box set by British-American rock band Fleetwood Mac originally released on 24 November 1992. The set contains four CDs, covering the history of the band from its formation in 1967 to 1992. The set features several previously unreleased studio tracks, new mixes, live recordings, and a slightly different mix of their international hit single "Tusk".

The extended version of Stevie Nicks' "Gypsy" was also included for the first time on a commercial release, and this collection also marked the first time Nicks' "Silver Springs" had appeared on a full-length Fleetwood Mac album. "Silver Springs" was originally intended for inclusion on the international multi-million selling album Rumours, however, it was removed from the track listing at the last minute. Up until its inclusion on The Chain, the only other appearance of "Silver Springs" was on the B-side of "Go Your Own Way". Mick Fleetwood turned down Nicks' request to include "Silver Springs" on her retrospective compilation Timespace: The Best of Stevie Nicks as he had already selected the song for the box set, 25 Years – The Chain. The disagreement was ultimately resolved and the song itself was eventually released as a single five years later in 1997, taken from the live album The Dance.

A condensed 2-CD version of the compilation was also available containing highlights from the 4-CD set. The popular hit single "Hold Me" was only available on this format as was the 1974 track "Bermuda Triangle". The new song "Love Shines" was released as a single in the UK, whereas "Paper Doll" was released in the US instead.

On 11 June 2012, the 4-disc version of The Chain was re-released in the UK at a budget price. It peaked at no. 9 on the UK album charts the same week and has since been certified Gold by the BPI. The album reached no. 1 in New Zealand where it has since been certified 2× Platinum.

Track listing

Standard 4 Disc Edition

Although listed as "I Believe My Time Ain't Long" (non-album single, 1967), the first track on disc 4 is actually "Dust My Broom", the fourth track from Fleetwood Mac's second studio album Mr. Wonderful.

Condensed 2 Disc Edition (Selections from 25 Years)

Released alongside the 4-CD box set was a 2-CD compilation featuring selected tracks from the main set. This version also includes two tracks which are excluded on the 4-CD box set; "Hold Me" and "Bermuda Triangle".

Charts

Weekly charts

Year-end charts

Decade-end charts

Certifications

Credits
Peter Green – guitars, vocals, banjo, bass guitar
Jeremy Spencer – guitars, piano, vocals
Danny Kirwan – guitars, vocals
Bob Welch – guitars, vocals
Bob Weston – electric guitars, acoustic guitars, slide guitar, vocals
Mick Fleetwood – drums, percussion, harpsichord
Stevie Nicks – vocals, tambourine, keyboards
Lindsey Buckingham – guitars, banjo, dobro, bass guitar, sitar, keyboards, percussion, lap harp, programming, vocals
Billy Burnette – guitars, dobro, vocals
Rick Vito – guitars, vocals
Christine McVie – keyboards, percussion, vocals
John McVie – bass guitar
Executive Producers – Mick Fleetwood and John McVie
Anthology produced and engineered by Ken Caillat
Historical research and co-ordination – Frank Harding

References

1992 compilation albums
Fleetwood Mac compilation albums
Warner Records compilation albums
Silver jubilees